The New Caledonian cuckooshrike or New Caledonian cicadabird (Edolisoma anale) is a species of bird in the family Campephagidae.
It is endemic to New Caledonia. Some taxonomists place this species in the genus Analisoma.

Its natural habitats are subtropical or tropical moist lowland forest and subtropical or tropical moist montane forest.

References

New Caledonian cuckooshrike
Endemic birds of New Caledonia
New Caledonian cuckooshrike
Taxonomy articles created by Polbot